John Modinos, a Cypriot opera baritone
 Modinos v. Cyprus,  a judgment of the European Court of Human Rights